Mount Atherton is a mountain in Canada. It is located in the province of Yukon, in the western part of the country, 4,100 km west of the capital Ottawa.   The peak of Mount Atherton  is 1,892 metres above sea level, or 625 metres above the surrounding terrain. The width at the base is 12.2 km. It was named after Charles Thomas Atherton, who succeeded Deacon Phelps as a member of the Yukon Territorial Council, representing Whitehorse from 1934 to 1937. 

Mount Atherton is part of the  Saint Cyr Range, a remote mountain range in the Yukon, Canada. It has an area of 6224 km2 and is a subrange of the Pelly Mountains which in turn form part of the Yukon Ranges.  Bivouac, the  Canadian Mountain Encyclopedia refers to Mount Atherton being	1905m (6250 feet) with a prominence of 550m.

The terrain around Mount Atherton  is mainly hilly, but to the southeast it is mountainous.  The highest point nearby is 2,130 metres above sea level, 8.8 km east of Mount Atherton. The area around Mount Atherton is almost uninhabited, with less than two inhabitants per km2. There are no communities nearby. The closest town is Faro, Yukon.

The area around Mount Atherton is essentially an open bush landscape. The area is part of the Subarctic climate or boreal climate zone.

Maps
 Administrative Boundaries Tay River 105K  
 Geoscience Map (General): Data Geology Reference Number:ARMC018806: Title Field map - Mount Atherton - 105K/4
 Topographical map of Mount Atherton 
 Geological maps of Mount Atherton and surrounding area
 Geology of Mt. Atherton [105K/4]
 Maps of adjacent mountains: Rose Mountain [105K/5], and Mount Mye [105K/6] 
 The Atlas of Canada - Toporama 
 Topography of Mount Atherton

Yukon Sources
 Yukon books:Topography of Yukon 
 Yukon Place Names: Mount Atherton

Canadian Government Sources
 Geoscan - Canada, National Topographic System Maps 105K/4, 1973, 1 sheet (Open Access): Data sheet of Mount Atherton, Yukon, Canada 
 Geoscan: Government of Canada map of Mount Atherton
 Geoscan Home Page (in event of links break)

Further reading
 Pelly Mountains
 Saint Cyr Range
List of mountain peaks of North America 
Mountain peaks of Canada

References

One-thousanders of Yukon